The 2017–18 season was Budapest Honvéd FC's 108th competitive season, 14th consecutive season in the OTP Bank Liga and 109th year in existence as a football club.

First team squad

Transfers

Summer

In:

Out:

Winter

In:

Out:

Statistics

Appearances and goals
Last updated on 25 May 2019.

|-
|colspan="14"|Youth players:

|-
|colspan="14"|Out to loan:

|-
|colspan="14"|Players no longer at the club:

|}

Top scorers
Includes all competitive matches. The list is sorted by shirt number when total goals are equal.
Last updated on 25 May 2019

Disciplinary record
Includes all competitive matches. Players with 1 card or more included only.

Last updated on 25 May 2019

Overall
{|class="wikitable"
|-
|Games played || 47 (33 OTP Bank Liga, 4 Europa League and 10 Hungarian Cup)
|-
|Games won || 23 (13 OTP Bank Liga, 2 Europa League and 8 Hungarian Cup)
|-
|Games drawn || 11 (10 OTP Bank Liga, 0 Europa League and 1 Hungarian Cup)
|-
|Games lost || 13 (10 OTP Bank Liga, 2 Europa League and 1 Hungarian Cup)
|-
|Goals scored || 77
|-
|Goals conceded || 49
|-
|Goal difference || +28
|-
|Yellow cards || 101
|-
|Red cards || 4
|-
|rowspan="1"|Worst discipline ||  Bence Batik (10 , 2 )
|-
|rowspan="1"|Best result || 0–3 (H) v MOL Vidi (Nemzeti Bajnokság I) - 18-08-2018
|-
|rowspan="1"|Worst result || 6–0 (H) v Bőny (Magyar Kupa) - 23-08-2018
|-
|rowspan="1"|Most appearances ||  Filip Holender (42 appearances)
|-
|rowspan="1"|Top scorer ||  Filip Holender (21 goals)
|-
|Points || 83/141 (58.86%)
|-

Nemzeti Bajnokság I

Matches

League table

Results summary

Results by round

Hungarian Cup

Europa League

References

External links
 Official Website
 UEFA
 fixtures and results

Budapest Honvéd FC seasons
Hungarian football clubs 2018–19 season